The Thiruvananthapuram City Police is the police force of the city of Thiruvananthapuram, Kerala, India. It has the primary responsibilities of law enforcement and investigation within the limits of Thiruvananthapuram. It is headed by the Commissioner of Thiruvananthapuram, who is generally an Indian Police Service (IPS) officer holding the IG rank. There are nine circles in the city. There is currently 17 police stations in the city. White Patrol and mobile units are in operation and their movements are supervised by marshal units.

Thiruvananthapuram City Police Mobile App, also known as TCP app, or iSafe, is the official mobile application for the citizens and public by the Thiruvananthapuram City Police.

Units
The City Police consists of following units:
 Law and order unit
This unit consists of 4 police subdivisions and 24 police stations. This unit is responsible for law and order maintenance as well as prevention and detection of crimes.
 Traffic unit
This unit consists of two subdivisions. This unit manages the traffic in the city.
 Control Room
 District Armed Reserve
This is the reserve force of Thiruvananthapuram City Police to assist the Local Police.
 Narcotics cell
This unit is responsible for the controlling of narcotics and drugs.
 Crime Detachment
This unit investigates some special cases.
 City Special Branch
This unit provides intelligence inputs to City Police.
 Dog Squad
This unit is responsible for the training of police dogs and their fitness.
 Mounted Police
This unit is responsible for the training of horses and their fitness.
 District Crime Records Bureau
This unit keeps the records of the criminals.
 Foreigners Registration Office
This unit is keeps records of foreigners.
 Tourist Police
Provides help to the tourists visiting the place and to maintain law and order at tourist spots.
 Women Police (Vanitha Cell)

List of Former Commissioner of Police
From January 1956 to November 1962, there was no separate Police commissionerate. An Superintendent of Police ranked officer served as the head of the Thiruvananthapuram district police. Since 1962, the Following officers have served as the Commissioner of Police in Thiruvananthapuram City.

 Symon T. Manjooran (November 1962 - May 1964)
 Srinivasa Rao (May 1964 - April 1965)
 T. Ananthshankara Iyer (April 1965 - June 1965)
 K. Sethumadhavamenon (June 1965 - March 1966)
 Symon T. Manjooran (March 1966 - June 1967)
 K. Sethumadhavamenon (June 1967 - July 1967)
 R. J. Padikkal (July 1967 - October 1967)
 P. K. Mohammad Hasan (October 1967 - February 1969)
 V. Krishnamoorthy (February 1969 - July 1970)
 C. Subramaniam (July 1970 - December 1973)
 P. R. Chandran (December 1973 - February 1975)
 N. Krishan Nair (February 1975 - June 1976)

References

External links
 Official website of the Thiruvananthapuram City Police

Government of Thiruvananthapuram
Metropolitan law enforcement agencies of India
Kerala Police
Government agencies established in 1881
1881 establishments in British India